General Secretary Kim may refer to:
Kim Il-sung (1912–1994), former General Secretary of the Workers' Party of Korea (1966-1994)
Kim Jong-il (1941–2011), former General Secretary of the Workers' Party of Korea (1997-2011)
Kim Jong-un (1984- ), current General Secretary of the Workers' Party of Korea (2021-)